is the 11th studio album by Japanese singer Hiroko Moriguchi, released on August 4, 2021, through King Records (under the Sonic Blade label) as part of her 35th anniversary celebration. It is Moriguchi's first original studio album since her 1997 release Happy Happy Blue.

Background 
Following the success of her last two albums Gundam Song Covers and Gundam Song Covers 2, Moriguchi was motivated to record a new studio album. In June 2021, she announced the title of the album as Aoi Inochi, with its theme being Mother Earth and her connection with all living things. The album includes a new a cappella recording of her 1985 debut single "Mizu no Hoshi e Ai wo Komete", featuring 35 tracks of Moriguchi's vocals. Other tracks include "Torikago no Shōnen" (from the pachinko game CR Fever Mobile Suit Zeta Gundam), "Hoshi Yori Saki ni Mitsukete Ageru" (the ending theme of One-Punch Man), and "I Wish ~Kimi ga Iru Kono Machi de~" (from the film Egao no Mukō ni).

The album is available in two editions: CD only and CD+Blu-ray combo. In addition, King Records' "Kinkuri-do" website offers a special autographed box set, featuring a music box that plays "Mizu no Hoshi e Ai wo Komete". The box set is limited to 350 units.

Chart performance 
Aoi Inochi peaked at No. 17 on Oricon's weekly albums chart, No. 19 on Billboard Japans Hot Albums chart, and No. 16 on Billboard Japans Top Album Sales chart.

Track listing

Charts

References

External links 
  (Hiroko Moriguchi)
  (King Records)
 

2021 albums
Hiroko Moriguchi albums
Japanese-language albums
King Records (Japan) albums